China competed in the 2009 Asian Indoor Games which were held in Hanoi, Vietnam from October 30, 2009 to November 8, 2009.

Medal summary

Medal table

Medal winners

See also
 China at the Asian Games
 China at the Olympics
 Sports in China

References

 Official site

Nations at the 2009 Asian Indoor Games
Asian Indoor Games
China at the Asian Indoor Games